The Ven.  Alfred Leslie Lilley  (14 August 1860 – 31 January 1948) was an Anglican priest and author.

Lilley was born in Clare, County Armagh, and educated at the Royal School, Armagh, and Trinity College Dublin. After a curacy in Glendermott he served at Holy Trinity, Sloane Street and St Mary on Paddington Green. He was a Canon Residentiary of Hereford Cathedral from 1911 to 1936; its Chancellor from 1922 to 1936; and Archdeacon of Ludlow from 1913 to 1928.

Character

E. H. Visiak describes Lilley in his 1968 memoir Life's Morning Hour as having "the aspect of a monk with a genial and sagacious mind", with "a capacity for suffering bores gladly". (Lilley provided the introduction for Visiak's 1911 poetry collection Flints and Flashes.)

Notes

1860 births
People educated at The Royal School, Armagh
Alumni of Trinity College Dublin
Archdeacons of Ludlow
1948 deaths